The Zhidan Group is a geological formation in China whose strata date back to the Early Cretaceous. Dinosaur remains are among the fossils that have been recovered from the formation.

Vertebrate paleofauna 
 Psittacosaurus sp.
 Sauroplites scutiger
 Wuerhosaurus ordosensis
 Huanhepterus quingyanensis
 Ikechosaurus sunailinae

See also 
 List of dinosaur-bearing rock formations

References 

Geologic groups of Asia
Geologic formations of China
Lower Cretaceous Series of Asia
Paleontology in Inner Mongolia